The Nazi term  or "coordination" was the process of Nazification by which Adolf Hitler and the Nazi Party successively established a system of totalitarian control and coordination over all aspects of German society and societies occupied by Nazi Germany "from the economy and trade associations to the media, culture and education". Although the Weimar Constitution remained nominally in effect until Germany's surrender following World War II, near total Nazification had been secured by the 1935 resolutions approved during the Nuremberg Rally, when the symbols of the Nazi Party and the State were fused (see Flag of Nazi Germany) and German Jews were deprived of their citizenship (see Nuremberg Laws).

Terminology
Its first use is credited to Reich Justice Minister Franz Gürtner. It has been variously translated as "coordination", "Nazification of state and society", "synchronization", and "bringing into line". English texts often use the untranslated German word to convey its unique historical meaning. In their seminal work on National Socialist vernacular, Nazi-Deutsch/Nazi-German: An English Lexicon of the Language of the Third Reich, historians Robert Michael and Karin Doerr define  as: "Consolidation. All of the German Volk's social, political, and cultural organizations to be controlled and run according to Nazi ideology and policy. All opposition to be eliminated."

Legal basis
The Nazis were able to put  into effect due to multiple legal measures enacted by the Reich government during the 20 months following 30 January 1933, when Adolf Hitler became Chancellor of Germany.

 Reichstag Fire Decree. The day after the Reichstag fire, President of Germany Paul von Hindenburg, acting at Hitler's request and based on the emergency powers in article 48 of the Weimar Constitution, issued the Reichstag Fire Decree (28 February 1933). This decree, formally titled "Decree of the Reich President for the Protection of People and State," suspended most citizen rights provided for by the constitution, including the right of habeas corpus, freedom of speech, press, assembly and privacy of communications. In this atmosphere, the general election of the  took place on 5 March 1933. The Nazis had hoped to win an outright majority and push aside their coalition partners, the German National People's Party (DNVP). However, the Nazis won only 43.9 percent of the vote, short of a majority and well below the number needed to amend the federal constitution.

 Enabling Act. When the newly elected  convened – not including the Communist delegates whose participation in politics had been banned – it passed the Enabling Act (23 March 1933). This law, formally titled "Law to Remedy the Distress of the People and the Reich," gave the government (the Reich Chancellor and his cabinet) the right to enact laws for a period of four years without the involvement of the Reichstag or the Reich President. As a constitutional amendment, it required a two-thirds majority for passage. Even with the proscription of the Communists, the Nazis and their ally the DNVP were still short of this number. Through intimidation of deputies by surrounding the Reichstag with a cordon of SA members, and through promises of religious freedom protections to the Catholic Centre Party, the acquiescence of a sufficient number of deputies was obtained. With only the SPD in opposition, the Enabling Act passed 444–94. For all intents and purposes, the entire Weimar Constitution was rendered void. This one piece of legislation formed the cornerstone on which the Nazi dictatorship circumvented the constitutional framework of the Weimar Republic and was able to impose its will on the nation by decree.

 Provisional Law on the Coordination of the States with the Reich. Enacted by the Reich government using the Enabling Act, the "Provisional Law on the Coordination of the States with the Reich" (31 March 1933) dissolved the sitting parliaments of all German states except the recently elected Prussian parliament, which the Nazis already controlled. It also ordered the state parliaments reconstituted based on the state votes cast in the 5 March Reichstag election (except for Communist seats, which were not filled). Under this provision, the Nazis and their DNVP partners were able to attain working majorities in all the parliaments. It further mandated the simultaneous dissolution of all state parliaments whenever the Reichstag was dissolved. It also gave the state governments the same powers to enact legislation that the Reich government possessed under the Enabling Act.

 Second Law on the Coordination of the States with the Reich. In order to further extend their power over the German states, the Reich government enacted the "Second Law on the Coordination of the States with the Reich" (7 April 1933). This measure deployed one  (Reich Governor) in each state. These officers, appointed by the President on the recommendation of the Chancellor, were responsible to Interior Minister Wilhelm Frick and were intended to act as local proconsuls in each state, with near-complete control over the state governments. They were empowered to preside over meetings of the state government, appoint and dismiss the state minister-president as well as other high officials and judges, dissolve the state parliament, call new elections and promulgate state laws.

 Law for the Restoration of a Professional Civil Service. Another measure of Nazi  was the enactment of the "Law for the Restoration of a Professional Civil Service" (7 April 1933), which mandated the "co-ordination" of the civil service – which in Germany included not only bureaucrats, but also schoolteachers and professors, judges, prosecutors, and other professionals – at the federal, state and municipal level, and authorized the removal of Jews and Communists from these positions, with limited exceptions for those who had fought in the First World War or had lost a father or son in combat.Law Against the Formation of Parties. The Communist Party had effectively been outlawed in all but name by the Reichstag Fire Decree, and was completely banned from 6 March. Following additional months of violence and intimidation against the Social Democratic Party, the government seized all its assets, and banned it outright on 22 June 1933, canceling all SDP electoral mandates in both the Reichstag and the state parliaments. By early July, all other parties, even the Nazis' erstwhile allies the DNVP, had been intimidated into dissolving themselves rather than face arrests and concentration camp imprisonment. Thus the DNVP (27 June) the German State Party (28 June), the Centre Party (3 July) the Bavarian People's Party (4 July) and the German People's Party (4 July) all formally disbanded. The "Law Against the Formation of Parties" (14 July 1933) declared the NSDAP as the country's only legal political party, formalizing what had already been accomplished through the campaign of Nazi terror and the complete capitulation of the opposition.

 Law on the Reconstruction of the Reich. All the state parliaments had been dissolved (along with the Reichstag) on 14 October 1933, and while new Reichstag elections took place on 12 November, no new state parliamentary elections were scheduled. Now, on the one-year anniversary of coming to power, the Reich government  passed through the Reichstag, by a unanimous vote, the "Law on the Reconstruction of the Reich" (30 January 1934). This was one of only seven laws passed by the Reichstag in the 19 sessions held during the entire Nazi regime, as opposed to 986 laws enacted solely by the Reich government under the authority of the Enabling Act. The law, in the form of a constitutional amendment, formally did away with the concept of a federal republic. The state parliaments were abolished altogether and state sovereignty passed to the central government. The states, though not themselves eliminated, were reduced to mere administrative bodies of the Reich, effectively converting Germany into a highly centralized unitary state. By destroying the autonomy of the historic German states, Hitler achieved what Bismarck, Wilhelm II and the Weimar Republic had never dared to attempt.

 Law on the Abolition of the Reichsrat. Within two weeks of the abolition of the state parliaments, the Reich government enacted the "Law on the Abolition of the Reichsrat" (14 February 1934) formally abolishing the Reichsrat, the second chamber of the national parliament that represented the states. This was a clear violation of not only the Weimar Constitution, but of Article 2 of the Enabling Act which had prohibited laws affecting the institution of the Reichsrat. 

 Law on the Head of State of the German Reich. With Reich President von Hindenburg fatally ill, the Reich government enacted the "Law on the Head of State of the German Reich" (1 August 1934). This law was signed by the entire Reich cabinet. It combined the office of Reich President with that of Reich Chancellor and was drawn up to become effective on the death of the Reich President, which occurred the next day. Again, this was a clear violation of the Enabling Act, which forbade any actions interfering with the office of the Reich President. With this law, Hitler became not only the head of state of the German nation, but also the commander-in-chief of the armed forces.

Coordination of the German Länder

When Hitler was appointed Reich Chancellor on 30 January 1933, the Nazi Party had control of only five of the seventeen German Länder (states). However, the Nazis acted swiftly to eliminate any potential centers of opposition arising in the remaining states. Immediately following the Reichstag election of 5 March 1933, the central government began in earnest its campaign to take over the state governments that it did not yet control, and within a very short period they achieved dominance over the administration in every state.

The pattern was in each case similar: pressure on the non-Nazi state governments to place a National Socialist in charge of the police; threatening demonstrations from SA and SS troops in the big cities; the symbolic raising of the swastika banner on town halls; the capitulation with hardly any resistance of the elected governments; the imposition of a Reich Commissar under the pretext of restoring order … Despite the semblance of legality, the usurpation of the powers of the Länder by the Reich was a plain breach of the Constitution. Force and pressure by the Nazi organizations themselves – political blackmail – had been solely responsible for creating the 'unrest' that had prompted the alleged restorations of 'order'. The terms of the emergency decree of 28 February provided no justification since there was plainly no need for defence from any 'communist acts of violence endangering the state'. The only such acts were those of the Nazis themselves.

The following table presents an overview of the process of Gleichschaltung as it was applied to the Nazification of the German Länder governments. While, strictly speaking, the Gleichschaltung process did not start until after the Nazi seizure of power at the Reich level at the end of January 1933, the table also presents earlier Nazi Party successes in infiltrating and taking charge of several German state administrations during 1930–1932. In most of these instances, they took the portfolio of the state interior ministries from which they controlled the police, installing Nazi adherents and purging opponents. 

Most coalition cabinets that the Nazis formed were with the participation of their conservative nationalist ally, the German National People's Party (DNVP). The "Law Against the Founding of New Parties" (14 July 1933) banned all parties except the Nazi Party. The DNVP members of the remaining coalition cabinets eventually either joined the Party or were replaced by Nazis, resulting in one-party government in all the Länder.

Propaganda and societal integration

One of the most critical steps towards  of German society was the introduction of the "Ministry of Public Enlightenment and Propaganda" under Joseph Goebbels in March 1933 and the subsequent steps taken by the Propaganda Ministry to assume complete control of the press and all means of social communication. This included oversight of newspapers, magazines, films, books, public meetings and ceremonies, foreign press relations, theater, art and music, radio, and television. To this end, Goebbels said:

[T]he secret of propaganda [is to] permeate the person it aims to grasp, without his even noticing that he is being permeated. Of course propaganda has a purpose, but the purpose must be concealed with such cleverness and virtuosity that the person on whom this purpose is to be carried out doesn't notice it at all.

This was also the purpose of "co-ordination": to ensure that every aspect of the lives of German citizens was permeated with the ideas and prejudices of the Nazis. From March to July 1933 and continuing afterward, the Nazi Party systematically eliminated or co-opted non-Nazi organizations that could potentially influence people. Those critical of Hitler and the Nazis were suppressed, intimidated, or murdered.

Every national voluntary association, and every local club, was brought under Nazi control, from industrial and agricultural pressure groups to sports associations, football clubs, male voice choirs, women's organizations—in short, the whole fabric of associational life was Nazified. Rival, politically oriented clubs or societies were merged into a single Nazi body. Existing leaders of voluntary associations were either unceremoniously ousted, or knuckled under of their own accord. Many organizations expelled leftish or liberal members and declared their allegiance to the new state and its institutions. The whole process ... went on all over Germany. ... By the end, virtually the only non-Nazi associations left were the army and the Churches with their lay organizations.

For example, in 1934, the government founded the Deutscher Reichsbund für Leibesübungen, later the Nationalsozialistischer Reichsbund für Leibesübungen, as the official sports governing body. All other German sport associations gradually lost their freedom and were coopted into it. Besides sports, another more important part of the "co-ordination" effort was the purging of the civil service, both at the Federal and state level. Top Federal civil servants—the State Secretaries—were largely replaced if they weren't sympathetic to the Nazi program, as were the equivalent bureaucrats in the states, but Nazification took place at every level. Civil servants rushed to join the Nazi Party, fearing they would lose their jobs if they did not. At the local level, mayors and councils were terrorized by Nazi stormtroopers of the SA and SS into resigning or following orders to replace officials and workers at local public institutions who were Jewish or belonged to other political parties.

The  also included the formation of various organizations with compulsory membership for segments of the population, particularly the youth of Germany. By 1940, membership in the Hitler Youth numbered some eight million.

Strength Through Joy
An all-embracing recreational organization for workers, called  ("Strength Through Joy") was set up under the auspices of the German Labor Front ( or DAF), which had been created when the Nazis forcibly dissolved the trade unions on 2 May 1933, thus nullifying the labor movement. Hobbies were regimented, and all private clubs, whether they be for chess, football, or woodworking, were brought under the control of Strength Through Joy, which also provided vacation trips, skiing, swimming, concerts, and ocean cruises. Some 43 million Germans enjoyed trips via the Strength Through Joy initiative. This effort inspired the idea of Germans acquiring automobiles and the construction the Autobahn. It was the largest of the many organizations established by the Nazis and a propaganda success.

Implications
Historian Claudia Koonz explains that the word  stems from the arena of electricity, where it refers to converting power from alternating current to direct current, which is called "rectification" in English; the word  translates literally as "phasing". Used in its socio-political sense,  has no equivalent in any other language. This seemingly clinical terminology captured both the mechanical and biological meaning for members of German society; as one German citizen visiting London explained, "It means the same stream will flow through the ethnic body politic []."

Former University of Dresden professor of romance languages, Viktor Klemperer—dismissed from his post for being Jewish in 1935 and who only survived his time in Germany due to being married to a prominent German woman—collected a list of terms employed in everyday speech by the Nazis, which he discussed in his book, LTI – Lingua Tertii Imperii, published in English as The Language of the Third Reich. In this work, Klemperer contends that the Nazis made the German language itself a servant to their ideology through its repetitive use, eventually permeating the very "flesh and blood" of its people. For instance, if it was sunny and pleasant, it was described as "Hitler weather", or if you failed to comply with Nazi ideals of racial and social conformity, you were "switched off."

When the blatant emphasis on racial hatred of others seemed to reach an impasse in the school system, through radio broadcasts, or on film reels, the overseers of Nazi  propaganda switched to strategies that focused more on togetherness and the "we-consciousness" of the collective Volk, but the mandates of Nazi "coordination" remained: pay homage to the Führer, expel all foreigners, sacrifice for the German people, and welcome future challenges. While greater German social and economic unity was produced through the Gleichschaltung initiatives of the regime, it was at the expense of individuality and to the social detriment of any nonconformist; and worse—it contributed to and reinforced the social and racial exclusion of anyone deemed an enemy by National Socialist doctrine.

See also
 Denazification

References

Citations

Bibliography

Further reading
 Bracher, Karl Dietrich (1972). "Stages of Totalitarian 'Integration': The Consolidation of National Socialist Rule in 1933 and 1934", in Republic To Reich The Making of the Nazi Revolution Ten Essays, edited by Hajo Holborn, New York: Pantheon Books. pp. 109–28
 Hughes, Everett (December 1955). "The  of the German Statistical Yearbook: A Case in Professional Political Neutrality". The American Statistician. Vol. IX. pp. 8–11.
 Kroeschell, Karl (1989). , 2nd ed., 
 Kroeschell, Karl (1992). ,

External links
 Lebendiges virtuelles Museum Online : Die Errichtung des Einparteienstaats 1933
 1933: Gleichschaltung

Society of Nazi Germany
Nazi terminology
German words and phrases
Politics of Nazi Germany

sv:Nazityskland#Gleichschaltung